This is a list of the squads for the 2021 CONCACAF Futsal Championship that will take place in Guatemala City between May 3 and 9, 2020. The 13 national teams involved in the tournament were required to register a squad of 14 players each, two of whom must be goalkeepers; only players in these squads were eligible to take part in the tournament.

Players marked (c) were named as captain for their national squad.

Group A

Dominican Republic
Coach:

Guatemala
Coach:

Trinidad and Tobago
Coach:

Group B

Mexico
Coach:

Panama
Coach:

Suriname
Coach:

Group C

Canada
Coach:  Kyt Selaidopoulos

Costa Rica
Coach:  Carlos Quirós Álvarez

Haiti
Coach:

Group D

Cuba
Coach:

El Salvador
Coach:

Nicaragua
Coach:

United States
Coach:  Dusan Jakica

References

CONCACAF Futsal Championship
Futsal tournament squads